Naqib Ahmed Chowdhury is a Major General of Bangladesh Army & General officer commanding (GOC) of 19th Infantry division. Prior to join here, he was Military Secretary to Prime Minister of Bangladesh, Sheikh Hasina from Dec 2019 to March 2022.

Career 
Chowdhury is a former College Secretary of National Defence College.

Chowdhury was the commander of Bangladesh Army in the Banderban region in 2015. He inaugurated a school by the JAAGO Foundation along with Superintendent of Police of Bandarban District Devdas Bhattacharya and Bohmong king U Chaw Prue Choudhury. He is a director of Trust Bank.

From 11 June 2018 to 13 January 2019 he was the Commander, 46th Independent Infantry Brigade

In 2019, he was the College Secretary of National Defense College.

Later he became General Officer Commanding (GOC) of 7th Infantry Division & Area Commander, Barishal Area,Patuakhali District.

References 

Living people
Bangladesh Army generals
Year of birth missing (living people)